Filppula is a Finnish surname. Notable people with the surname include:

 Ilari Filppula (born 1981), Finnish ice hockey player
 Valtteri Filppula (born 1984), Finnish ice hockey player, brother of Ilari

Finnish-language surnames